Paddock is the codeword for an alternative Cabinet War Room bunker for Winston Churchill's World War II government, located at 109 Brook Road, Dollis Hill, northwest London, NW2 7DZ; under a corner of the Post Office Research Station site.  The name derives from the nearby Paddock Road NW2, in turn named after a nineteenth-century stud farm, the Willesden Paddocks, situated nearby.

The bombproof bunker was constructed  underground from reinforced concrete in total secrecy in 1939, but only rarely used during the war, with only two meetings of the War Cabinet being held there.  It was abandoned in 1944.

It comprises some forty rooms on two floors, is semi-derelict, with original equipment abandoned and rusted, and a certain amount of water ingress which is kept at bay by an electric extraction pump.

Paddock was used after World War II by the Post Office for research and development and by the Post Office Research Laboratories Sports and Social Club.  Paddock lay unused from when the Post Office moved to Martlesham Heath (Suffolk) and vacated the site in 1976, until Network Homes purchased the site (including Paddock) in 1997.

The bunker is now owned by Network Homes, an affordable housing association which is responsible for the properties now occupying part of the former research station site above.  It used to be open to the public two or three times a year, with free guided tours provided by volunteers from the Subterranea Britannica organisation.  It featured on the Channel 5 programme, Underground Britain.

See also
Military citadels under London

References

External links
Comprehensive history and record of site visit — at Subterranea Britannica
The Paddock Information Collection (over 2,200 pages of information) The most comprehensive source of information about Paddock
Churchill's bunker - twice-yearly bunker open days, and a 'virtual tour', Network Homes
Location on Google StreetView

Former buildings and structures in the London Borough of Brent
Subterranean London
Fortifications of London
1939 in London
World War II sites in England
Bunkers in the United Kingdom
Buildings and structures completed in 1939
Military history of London